Collinsia is a genus of dwarf spiders that was first described by Octavius Pickard-Cambridge in 1913.

Species
 it contains twenty-four species and one subspecies:
Collinsia borea (L. Koch, 1879) – Russia (Novaya Zemlya, Middle Siberia to Far North-East), USA (Alaska)
Collinsia caliginosa (L. Koch, 1879) – Russia (Europe to Far East), Central Asia
Collinsia c. nemenziana Thaler, 1980 – Austria
Collinsia clypiella (Chamberlin, 1920) – USA
Collinsia dentata Eskov, 1990 – Russia (West Siberia to Far East)
Collinsia despaxi (Denis, 1950) – Spain, France
Collinsia distincta (Simon, 1884) (type) – Europe, Russia (Europe to South Siberia)
Collinsia ezoensis (Saito, 1986) – Japan
Collinsia hibernica (Simon, 1926) – France
Collinsia holmgreni (Thorell, 1871) – USA (Alaska), Canada, Greenland, Northern Europe, Russia (Europe to Far East), China
Collinsia holmi Eskov, 1990 – Russia (north-eastern Siberia, Far North-East)
Collinsia inerrans (O. Pickard-Cambridge, 1885) – Europe, Caucasus, Russia (Europe to Far East), Central Asia, China, Korea, Japan
Collinsia ksenia (Crosby & Bishop, 1928) – USA, Canada
Collinsia oatimpa (Chamberlin, 1949) – USA
Collinsia oxypaederotipus (Crosby, 1905) – USA
Collinsia palmeni Hackman, 1954 – Canada
Collinsia perplexa (Keyserling, 1886) – USA
Collinsia pertinens (O. Pickard-Cambridge, 1875) – USA
Collinsia plumosa (Emerton, 1882) – USA, Canada
Collinsia probata (O. Pickard-Cambridge, 1874) – USA
Collinsia sachalinensis Eskov, 1990 – Russia (Sakhalin, Kurile Is.), Japan
Collinsia spetsbergensis (Thorell, 1871) – USA (Alaska), Canada, Northern Europe, Russia (Europe to Far East)
Collinsia stylifera (Chamberlin, 1949) – USA, Canada
Collinsia thulensis (Jackson, 1934) – USA (Alaska), Canada, Greenland, Spitsbergen, Russia (Far North-East)
Collinsia tianschanica Tanasevitch, 1989 – Kyrgyzstan

See also
 List of Linyphiidae species

References

Araneomorphae genera
Cosmopolitan spiders
Linyphiidae
Taxa named by Octavius Pickard-Cambridge